Renée Kosel is a Republican former member of the Illinois House of Representatives, representing the 81st district from 1997 until her resignation on January 7, 2015. While in the Illinois House of Representatives, Kosel previously served as an Assistant Republican Leader. The district includes all or parts of Frankfort, Homer Glen, Homer Township, Joliet, Mokena, New Lenox, Orland Park and Tinley Park. As of October 2012, Kosel is a member of the American Legislative Exchange Council (ALEC) previously serving as Illinois state co-chairman.

References

External links
 Representative Renée Kosel (R) 81st District at the Illinois General Assembly
 98th 97th, 96th 95th, 94th 93rd
 http://www.rkosel.org/ State Representative Renée Kosel] constituency site
 
 Renee Kosel at Illinois House Republican Caucus

Republican Party members of the Illinois House of Representatives
1943 births
Living people
Politicians from Chicago
Women state legislators in Illinois
21st-century American politicians
21st-century American women politicians